Major Gerald Herbert Loxley (1885–1950) was a decorated British aviator of the First World War deployed in military intelligence, before serving with the United Nations in Switzerland.

Biography
Born on 31 January 1885 at Fairford, Gloucestershire, a vicar's son, he was named after his godfather Sir Herbert Brewer. 

Loxley attended Summer Fields School and Malvern College before going up to read Jurisprudence at Oriel College, Oxford.

His World War I service in the Royal Naval Air Service saw action as an air pilot before being appointed to a distinguished position in aerial reconnaissance, advising the director-general of aircraft production (Ministry of Munitions) in Paris. He was appointed in the rank of Major upon the creation of the Royal Air Force in 1919.

Later in life Major Loxley served as a diplomat at the United Nations Organization at Geneva.

Family

The 5th child and 4th son of the Revd Canon Arthur Smart Loxley, son of John Loxley of Norcott Court, near Berkhamsted, Hertfordshire, he was the only one of the Loxley brothers to survive the Great War. In 1930 he married Alice Blundell Booth (died 1955, leaving no children), a descendant of that old Cheshire family. Through Julia Maria Heath a collateral ancestor of his was the poet Lord Byron; and, with Cornish ancestry, his family was also closely related to Lord Dover and the Duncombes.

After suffering a severe stroke, Loxley died on 29 September 1950 at St Mary's Hospital, Burghill, near Hereford.

Honours and awards
Loxley received the Air Force Cross and was invested as a Chevalier of the Légion d'honneur by Marshal Foch in 1919, having been appointed Ufficiale of the Corona d'Italia in 1916. 

He received many other military honours as well as being admitted as a Freeman of the City of London "for War Services".

See also

 Baron Bingham of Cornhill

References

External links
 The Malvern Register
 www.nationalarchives.gov.uk

1885 births
People from Fairford
1950 deaths
People educated at Malvern College
Alumni of Oriel College, Oxford
British intelligence operatives
Royal Naval Air Service personnel of World War I
Royal Air Force personnel of World War I
Recipients of the Air Force Cross (United Kingdom)
Recipients of the Legion of Honour
Recipients of Italian civil awards and decorations
British officials of the United Nations